The UK Web Archive is a consortium of the six UK legal deposit libraries which aims to collect all UK websites at least once each year.

History 
In 2005, the British Library, The National Archives, Wellcome Trust, National Library of Scotland, National Library of Wales and JISC formed the UK Web Archiving Consortium, a project to archive websites.

UKWAC archived selected websites by licence or permission, using PANDAS software developed by the National Library of Australia. During the project its members collected sites relevant to their interest; the Wellcome Library collected medical sites, the national libraries sites that reflect life in contemporary Wales or Scotland. The British Library worked with a broad policy of collecting sites of cultural, historical and political importance to the UK.

The Consortium wound up in 2010. The Archiving and Preservation Working Group took over UKWAC's co-ordinating role web archiving in the UK. The Digital Preservation Coalition hosts the working group.

Web Archiving
The archive undertakes an annual crawl of .uk and other UK geographic Top Level Domains such as .scot, .cymru or .london. The crawl is archived in a shared infrastructure called the Digital Library System. Members of the public can nominate sites for preservation there through the UKWA website. The whole web archive is available to registered readers on library premises; and where permission has been given, or license conditions can be met, copies are also accessible through the website.

The archive gathers sites in response to events, building collections - these have preserved writing and imagery recording natural disasters, election campaigns since 2005 and the UK's blogosphere for research, among more than a hundred more.

SHINE 

The UK Web Archive holds a collection of all the .uk websites that were archived by the Internet Archive until the end of March in 2013. SHINE is a web interface which can be used to create repeatable lists of results of historical .uk pages. Trends, or occurrences of keywords in the data set on .uk pages over that time, use concordance to show keywords in context.

Mementos 
Memento is a name for prior versions of web pages coined by the Memento Project. The UK Web Archive Memento interface allows Mementos to be found across web archives. The interface can be used to find a Memento by its date in a snapshot table, or see how often a site appears across public web archives.

Researching the archive 
Research into the web as a reflection of society has helped develop access to the archive. Libraries have developed guides to research skills needed to use web archives. These include using big data to see patterns or trends, or writing citations for archived copies of websites.

GLAM Workbench 
GLAM Workbench is a project which looks at how researchers can use data preserved by galleries, libraries, archives and museums. It includes a collection of Jupyter notebooks which draw on Mementos and index data. The notebooks mix description and editable code to help researchers find evidence in web archives.

See also
National Records of Scotland Web Continuity Service
Public Record Office of Northern Ireland Web Archive
UK Government Web Archive
UK Parliament Web Archive
Web Archiving Initiatives

References

External links
 UK Web Archive home page
 The UKWA blog
 UK Government Web Archive Archived UK government websites, run by UK National Archives
 Digital Preservation Coalition - Web Archiving and Preservation Task Force

Archives in the United Kingdom
College and university associations and consortia in the United Kingdom
Information technology organisations based in the United Kingdom
Internet in the United Kingdom
British digital libraries
Organizations established in 2005
Web archiving
Web archiving initiatives
2005 establishments in the United Kingdom